Interstate 305 may refer to:
Interstate 305 (California), an unsigned designation for U.S. Route 50 and Interstate 80 Business in West Sacramento and Sacramento, California
Interstate 305 (Oregon), an unbuilt auxiliary designation for Oregon Route 99E Business in Salem, Oregon

05-3
3